Oriyono Dushanbe is football club based in Dushanbe in Tajikistan.

History
In 2007, Oriyono Dushanbe merged with Dynamo Dushanbe, and took the later club's name.

Domestic history

References

External links

Football clubs in Tajikistan
Football clubs in Dushanbe